Jonathan Bamaiyi, consecrated in 1998,  is an Anglican bishop in Nigeria: he is the current Bishop of Katsina, one of ten dioceses within the Anglican Province of Kaduna, itself one of 14 provinces within the Church of Nigeria.

He was elected in 2007 as Bishop of Katsina.

Notes

Living people
Anglican bishops of Katsina
21st-century Anglican bishops in Nigeria
Year of birth missing (living people)